Healthcare information can refer to:
 Healthcare information systems
 Healthcare information technology
 Healthcare Information For All - a community of practice
 Healthcare Information Technology Standards Panel